

Within the field of computer graphics, unbiased rendering refers to any rendering technique that does not introduce systematic error, or bias, into the radiance approximation. The term refers to statistical bias, not the broader meaning of subjective bias. Because of this, an unbiased rendering technique can produce a reference image to compare against renders that use other techniques. In simple terms, unbiased rendering tries to mimic the real world as closely as possible without taking short cuts. Path tracing and its derivatives can be unbiased, whereas ray tracing was originally biased.

Mathematical definition 
Mathematically speaking, the expected value (E) of an unbiased estimator is the population mean, regardless of the number of observations. The error found in a render produced by an unbiased rendering technique is due to random statistical variance, which manifests as high-frequency noise. This means that an image produced by an unbiased renderer that appears noiseless and smooth is probabilistically correct.

A biased rendering method is not necessarily wrong, and can still produce images close to those given by the rendering equation if the estimator is consistent. These methods, however, introduce a certain bias error (usually in the form of a blur) in efforts to reduce the variance (high-frequency noise). Often biased rendering is optimized to compute faster at the cost of accuracy.

Caustics example 
It is important to note that an unbiased technique can not consider all possible paths (because there are infinite), and may not select ideal paths for a given render (because to select certain paths over others introduces bias). Path tracing, an unbiased approach at its core, cannot consistently handle caustics generated from a point light source, as it is highly unlikely to randomly generate the singular path that directly reflects into the point.

Progressive photon mapping (PPM), a biased rendering technique, can actually handle caustics quite well. Although biased, PPM is provably consistent, meaning that as the number of samples goes to infinity, the bias error goes to zero (like an unbiased technique), and the probability that the estimate is correct reaches one.

List of unbiased rendering methods 

Path tracing
Bidirectional path tracing
Metropolis light transport and the related "energy redistribution path tracing" (ESPT)

List of unbiased renderers
Arion
Arnold
Cycles
Indigo Renderer
Kerkythea
LuxRender
Mantra
Maxwell Render
Octane Render
Fstorm Render (external link)

See also
Global illumination (GI)
Physically based rendering (PBR)
Non-photorealistic rendering (NPR)

References

Bibliography

 
 
 

3D rendering